USS Haddo has been the name of more than one United States Navy ship, and may refer to:

 , a submarine in commission from 1942 to 1946
 , a submarine in commission from 1964 to 1991

United States Navy ship names